"The Lincoln Train" is an alternate history short story published by Maureen F. McHugh, published in April 1995. It is collected in volume 31 of the Nebula Awards anthologies, in Alternate Tyrants (1997), and in Best of the Best: 20 Years of the Year's Best Science Fiction (2005).

Plot summary
The story follows Clara Corbett, a teen-aged girl from Mississippi who is being forcibly removed from her home following the end of the American Civil War. Clara is from a slave-owning family, and is boarding the train with her mother when the latter suddenly dies. Travelling alone, Clara is approached by Elizabeth Loudon, and they travel together to St. Louis. Clara initially fears that Elizabeth is an adventuress who will kidnap her and take her to parts unknown, but she is a Quaker and a member of an Underground Railroad network that rescues people in Clara's situation. Clara journeys with her, her final destination being her sister Julia's home in Tennessee. As she tries to offer help to the Quakers, however, Elizabeth grows cold and rebuffs her, stating that "there are no slavers in [their] ranks."

Alternate history
The point of divergence occurs on April 14, 1865, when John Wilkes Booth's bullet fails to kill Abraham Lincoln, but renders him a vegetable, and incapable of governing the nation. Secretary of State William H. Seward is widely believed to be the true national policy maker. Seward instigates a harsh policy of removing all Southerners who had owned slaves to the western territories in a neo-Trail of Tears, where many of them are left to die of starvation and disease. The brevity of the story, and the limit of its narrative viewpoint to one young girl in a remote province, do not allow this alternate history to be examined in any great depth.

Author's comment
In her letter accompanying the story in volume 31 of the Nebula Awards collection, Maureen McHugh states that she originally intended to write a story from Lincoln's perspective, but after reading his speeches and letters, felt incapable of "capturing the man on paper," and so kept him "offstage."

Reception
"Train" won the 1996 Hugo Award for Best Short Story and the 1996 Locus Award.  It was also nominated for the 1996 Nebula Award for Best Short Story.

Historical inaccuracies
Several references are made to Oklahoma Territory, but no such entity existed until 1890. The territories that existed in the setting of the story at the time were the Indian Territory and the Unorganized Territory.

References

Science fiction short stories
1995 short stories
Hugo Award for Best Short Story winning works
Alternate history short stories
Works originally published in The Magazine of Fantasy & Science Fiction
American Civil War alternate histories
Cultural depictions of Abraham Lincoln